Windows Driver Frameworks (WDF, formerly Windows Driver Foundation), is a set of Microsoft tools and libraries that aid in the creation of device drivers for Windows 2000 and later versions of Windows. It complements Windows Driver Model, abstracting away much of the boilerplate complexity in writing Windows drivers.

WDF consists of Kernel-Mode Driver Framework (KMDF) and User-Mode Driver Framework (UMDF). These individual frameworks provide a new object-oriented programming model for Windows driver development. The primary goals of WDF is conceptual scalability and reduced duplication, enabling developers to apply the same concepts across different driver types and reducing the code overhead required for drivers. This differs markedly from the Windows Driver Model (WDM) which requires driver developers to be fully familiar with many complex technical details to write a basic driver.

Part of the key to achieving conceptual scalability is that KMDF and UMDF use an "opt-in" model. This model allows the developer to extend and override the default behavior of a canonical "good driver". In contrast, Windows Driver Model depends on the driver writer to implement all aspects of the driver's behavior.

Varieties
There are three types of WDF drivers:

 Kernel-Mode Driver Framework, for writing standard kernel-mode device drivers
 User-Mode Driver Framework v1, for writing user-mode drivers using a C++ COM-based API
 User-Mode Driver Framework v2, for writing user-mode drivers with syntactic parity to KMDF

WDF also includes a set of static verification tools for use by driver writers. These tools examine driver code for common errors and/or simulate the code of a driver in order to identify problems that are both difficult to detect and difficult to test for.

Versions

Bold "Yes" means introduced with this version of Windows.

See also
Windows Driver Kit

References

External links
 
 Developing Drivers with the Windows Driver Foundation by Orwick and Smith
 Windows Driver Kit
 OSR Online, including many articles about WDF, KMDF, and Windows driver development
 , written by well-known Windows driver developer, Walter Oney
 Building and deploying a basic WDF Kernel Mode Driver, CodeProject
 Developing a WDF USB Kernel Mode Driver for the OSR USB FX2, CodeProject

Device drivers
Free and open-source software
Driver Foundation
Microsoft free software
Software using the MIT license
Windows-only free software